Sébastien Guèze (born 28 July 1979) is a classical French tenor. He sings the French and Italian romantic repertory including Donizetti, Verdi, Puccini, Gounod, Bizet and Massenet.

Biography 
Born in Lyon, France, he grew up in the Ardèche mountains in south of France, he studied singing at the conservatory of Nîmes, doing a Master in Business at the University of Montpellier, then he came to the National Conservatory of Music of Paris that he finished First Prize with Jury congratulations.

In 2006, he won the Audience Prize and the Second Prize at international contest of Plácido Domingo, Operalia.

He started titles roles with Rodolfo in La bohème in 2008 at the National Opera of Athens staged by Graham Vick, then receiving widespread recognition as one of the most promising tenors of his generation. French Tenor Sebastien Gueze has come to international attention for his performances in theaters including the Semperoper Dresden, Theatre Royale de le Monnaie Brussels, La Fenice Venezia, Roma Santa Cecilia, Paris Opera Comique, Paris Théâtre des Champs Elysées, Opera de Marseille, Opera de Bordeaux, Teatro São Pedro São Paulo, Opera de Nuevo León Mexico, The Warsaw Opera, the Florida Grand Opera in Miami and many others.

Awards

Prizes 
Audience Prize and Second Prize, Contest Plácido Domingo – Operalia, 2008
First Prize at Conservatoire national supérieur de musique et de danse de Paris avec "Félicitations du Jury", 2008
First Prize European Voice Contest of Arles, 2004
Silver Voice (First Prize Man) at "Tournoi de Metz", France, 2003

Nominations 
2006 : L'ADAMI (National Administration for artists and musicians), named Lyric Artist Revelation
2009 : Victoires de la musique classique, catégory ''Lyric Artist Revelation of the year.

Career

Venues
La Fenice Venezia, Semperoper Dresden, La Monnaie De Munt Brussels, Roma Santa Cecilia, Paris Opera Comique, Théâtre des Champs Elysées Paris, Miami Florida Grand Opera, Long Center Austin Opera, Palau de les Arts Reina Sofia Valencia, Opera de Marseille, Opera de Bordeaux, Teatro São Pedro São Paulo, Opera de Nuevo León Mexico, Hong Kong, Opera Omaha, Theatr Wielki Warsaw
Concertgebouw Amsterdam, Oji Hall Tokio, Walt Disney Concert Hall Los Angeles, Salle Pleyel Paris, Grand Hall Philharmonia Saint Petersburg
Festival des Chorégies d'Orange, Festival de Spoleto (Italie), Festival de Schwetzingen, Festival de Nuremberg, Festival de Radio France, Festival "Un violon sur le sable", Festival International des Arts d’Harare (Zimbabwe), Festival des Alizés Maroc

Main roles 
La bohème – Rodolfo (15 productions: La Fenice Venezia, La Monnaie Brussels, Köln, Athens, Austin Texas, Helsinki Finland, Liège Belgium, Dessau, Vichy, Saint-Etienne, Vilnius, Leeds, Manchester, Wiesbaden, Bordeaux)
Les Contes d'Hoffmann – Hoffmann (5 productions: Essen Aalto theater, Dresden Semperoper, Freiburg, Hessisches Staatstheater Wiesbaden, Bonn Oper)
Faust – Faust (5 productions: Omaha, Wroclaw, Pampelune Spain, Reims, Toulon France)
Roméo et Juliette – Romeo (4 productions: Miami, Hong Kong, Amsterdam, Monterrey Mexico)
Werther – Werther (4 productions: La Fenice Venice Italia, Operas of Metz, Massy, Reims France)  
La traviata – Alfredo (4 productions: Dresden Semperoper, La Monnaie De Munt Bruxelles, Theatr Wielki Warsaw, Louisville USA)
Madama Butterfly – Pinkerton (3 productions: Avignon, Festival de Chartres, Festival Musiques au Coeur Antibes)
Rigoletto – Il duca (2 productions: Mantova Italy, Guadalajara Mexico)
Manon – Chevalier des Grieux (2 productions: Marseille, France; Vilnius Lithuanian National Opera)
L'elisir d'amore – Nemorino (São Paulo, Brazil)
Les pêcheurs de perles – Nadir (Strasbourg Mulhouse Opera du Rhin)
Pelléas et Mélisande – Pelléas (Opéra de Nice, France)

Chronology 
2023 : La Rondine (Puccini), role Ruggero, Opera North Leeds
2023 : Hérodiade (Jules Massenet), role Jean, Deutsche Oper am Rhein, Düsseldorf, Germany
2023 : Andromaque (Gretry), role Pyrrhus, conductor stage, Opéra de Saint Etienne 
2022 : Madama Butterfly, role Pinkerton, conductor Rudolf Piehlmayer, stage Fabio Ceresa, Opéras de Nantes, Angers
2022 : Madama Butterfly, Pinkerton, stage Fabio Ceresa, Opéra de Rennes
2022 : Carmen, Bizet, role Don José, conductor Antony Hermus, stage Edward Dick, Opera North Leeds
2021 : Carmen, Bizet, role Don José, conductor Omer Meir Wellber, stage Calixto Bieito, Opera Palermo
2021 : Carmen, Bizet, role Don José, conductor Anu Tali, stage Calixto Bieito, Opera Sevilla, Spain
2020 : Carmen, role Don José, Oper Leipzig, Germany
2020 : Songes d’une nuit d’été, Thomas, rôle Shakespeare, conductor Guillaume Tournaire, stage Stefania Panaghini, Wexford Festival 
2020 : Adriana Lecouvreur, Cilea, role Maurizio, conductor Paolo Arrivabeni, stage Davide Livermore, Marseille 
2020: La Damnation de Faust, Berlioz, role Faust, Metropolitan Opera, USA
2019: La Vestale by Spontini, conductor Bertrand De Billy, stage Johannes Erath, Theater an der Wien (Austria)
2019: The Tales of Hoffmann, Offenbach, conductor Kent Nagano, Koeln Philharmonie (Germany)
2019: Carmen, Bizet, role Don José, conductor Patrick Lange, stage Uwe Laufenberg, Staatstheater Wiesbaden (Germany)
2019: Carmen, Bizet, role Don José, conductor José Miguel Perez-Sierra, stage Paul Emile Fourny, Opera Metz Metropole (France)
2019: Eugene Oneguin by Piotr Ilitch Tchaïkovski, role Lensky, conductor James Meena, stage Tom Diamond, Charlotte Opera Carolina (USA)
2019: Faust, Gounod, conductor Steven White, stage Leleana Blain-Cruz, Omaha (USA)
2019: Werther, Jules Massenet, conductor Guillaume Tourniaire, stage Rosetta Cucchi, La Fenice, Venezia (Italy)
2018 : Manon, Jules Massenet, role Des Grieux, conductor Julius Geniušas, stage Vincent Boussard, Lithuanian National Opera, Vilnius (Lithuania)
2018: CREATION “Nous sommes éternels” role Dan, composer Pierre Bartholomée, libretto Pierrette Fleutiaux, conductor Patrick Davin, stage Vincent Goethals, Opera Metz Metropole
2018: Carmen, Bizet, role Don José, conductor John Fiore, stage Reinhild Hoffmann, Grand Théâtre of Geneva
2018: Adriana Lecouvreur, Cilea, role Maurizio, conductor Fabrizio Maria Carminati, stage Davide Livermore, Saint-Etiennes (France)
2017: The Tales of Hoffmann, Offenbach, Dresden Semperoper and Freiburg (Germany)
2017: Faust (opera), Faust, Gounod, Wroclaw (Poland) and Vilnius (Lithuania)
2017: Cyrano, David DiChiera, role Christian, Detroit and Charlotte Opera Carolina (USA)
2017: Werther, Massenet, conductor David T. Heusel, stage Paul-Emile Fourny, Metz Metropole, Massy, Reims (France)
2017: La Boheme, Puccini, conductor Paolo Arrivabeni, stage Matthias Hartmann, Grand Théâtre of Geneva
2016: The Tales of Hoffmann by Offenbach, Essen Aalto theater (Germany)
2016 : Jérusalem by Giuseppe Verdi, role Gaston, conductor Will Humburg, stage Francisco Negrin, Opera Bonn, Germany
2016 : Le Roi d'Ys by Edouard Lalo, role Mylio, conductor José Luis Dominguez, stage Jean-Louis Pichon, Opéra Théâtre de Saint Etienne, Saint-Étienne, France
2015 : Rigoletto by Giuseppe Verdi, role il Duca, conductor Marco Parisotto, stage Ragnar Conde, Teatro Degollado Guadalajara, Mexico
2015 : Manon by Jules Massenet, role Des Grieux, with Patrizia Ciofi, conductor Alexander Joel, stage Renée Auphan / Yves Coudray, Opera Municipal de Marseille, France
2015 : Les Contes d'Hoffmann by Jacques Offenbach, role Hoffmann, conductor Hendrik Vestmann / Johannes Pell, stage Renaud Doucet / André Barbe, Opera Bonn, Germany
2015 : Les Mousquetaires au couvent by Louis Varney, role "Gontran de Solanges" stage Jérôme Deschamps, conductor Laurent Campellone, Opéra Comique, Paris, France
2015 : Les Contes d'Hoffmann by Jacques Offenbach, role Hoffmann, conductor Michael Helmrath, stage Jakob Peters-Messer, Opera Staatstheater Wiesbaden, Germany
2014 : Romeo et Juliette by Charles Gounod, role Roméo, conductor Guido Maria Guido, stage Raúl Falcó, Opera de Nuevo León Monterrey Mexico, Mexico
2014 : Un Amour En Guerre by Caroline Glory, role Jacques, conductor Jacques Blanc, stage , Opera de Metz, France
2014 : La Bohème by Giacomo Puccini, role Rodolfo, conductor Zsolt Hamar, stage Thorleifur Örn Arnarsson, Opera de Wiesbaden, Germany
2014 : La Bohème by Giacomo Puccini, role Rodolfo, conductor Paul Daniel, stage Laurent Laffargue, Opera National de Bordeaux, France
2014 : La Bohème by Giacomo Puccini, role Rodolfo, conductor Andreas Delfs - Ilyich Rivas, stage Phyllida Lloyd - Michael Barker-Caven, Opera North Leeds Manchester, England
2014 : La Bohème by Giacomo Puccini, role Rodolfo, conductor Gintaras Rinkevicius, stage Dalia Ibelhauptaitė, Vilnius City Opera, Lithuania
2014 : Concert Opera Gala Saint Petersburg Philharmonia, with Julia Novikova, conductor Jean Ferrandis, Grand Hall Philharmonia Saint Petersburg, Russia
2013 : Madama Butterfly by Giacomo Puccini, role Pinkerton, with Ermonela Jaho, stage Mireille Laroche, conductor Alain Guingual, Opéra d'Avignon
2013 : Les Mousquetaires au couvent by Louis Varney, role "Gontran de Solanges" stage Jérôme Deschamps, conductor Philippe Béran, Opéra de Lausanne
2013 : Dialogues des Carmélites by Francis Poulenc, role "Chevalier de La Force", with Hélène Guilmette, Sabine Devieilhe, stage Christophe Honoré, conductor Kasushi Ono, Opéra national de Lyon
2013 : Les pêcheurs de perles by Georges Bizet, role Nadir, conductor Patrick Davin, stage Vincent Boussard, Opéra de Strasbourg, France
2013 : Le Roi d'Ys by Edouard Lalo, role Mylio, conductor Patrick Davin, Opéra-Comique Paris
2013 : La Traviata by Giuseppe Verdi, role Alfredo Germont, stage Andreas Homoki, conductor Julian Kovatchev, Semperoper Dresden
2013 : Pelléas et Mélisande by Claude Debussy, role "Pelléas", conductor Philippe Auguin, staged by René Koering, Opéra de Nice
2012 : La Traviata by Giuseppe Verdi, role Alfredo Germont, conductor Ádám Fischer, stage Andrea Breth, Théâtre royal de la Monnaie
2012 : La Bohème by Giacomo Puccini, role Rodolfo, stage Claude Stratz, Opéra de Vichy, France
2012 : L'elisir d'amore by Gaetano Donizetti, role Nemorino, stage director Walter Neiva, conductor Emiliano Patarra, Opéra Teatro São Pedro São Paulo, Brazil
2012 : Romeo and Juliet by Charles Gounod, role Roméo, conductor Joseph Mechavich, stage David Lefkowich, Florida Grand Opera, Miami, United States
2012 : Faust by Charles Gounod, role Faust, conductor Dominique Trottein, stage Paul Emile Fourny, Opéra de Reims, France
2012 : La Chartreuse de Parme by Henri Sauguet, role Fabrice del Dongo, conductor Lawrence Foster, stage Renée Auphan, Opéra municipal de Marseille, France
2011-2012 : La Bohème by Giacomo Puccini, role Rodolfo, conductor Antony Hermus, stage Roman Hovenbitzer, Anhaltisches Theater, Germany
2011 : Faust by Charles Gounod, role Faust, conductor Antony Hermus, stage Paul Emile Fourny, Opéra de Toulon
2011-2012 : La Grande-Duchesse de Gérolstein by Jacques Offenbach, role Fritz, conductor Cyril Diedrich, stage Omar Porras, Opéra de Lausanne, Switzerland
2011 : "Amelia al ballo" by Gian Carlo Menotti, role L'amante, conductor Plácido Domingo, stage Jean Louis Grinda, Palau de les Arts Reina Sofia, Valencia, Spain
2011 : "Amelia al ballo" by Gian Carlo Menotti, role L'amante, conductor Johannes Debus, stage Giorgio Ferrara, Festival dei due mondi Spoleto Italia
2011 : "Cyrano de Bergerac" by David DiChiera, role Christian, conductor Mark Flint, stage Bernard Uzan, Florida Grand Opera, Miami, United States
2011 : La Bohème de Giacomo Puccini, role Rodolfo, conductor Juraj Valčuha et Matteo Beltrami, stage Francesco Micheli, Venise La Fenice, Italy
2011 : La Bohème de Giacomo Puccini, role Rodolfo, direction musicale de, mise en sène de, Opéra Helsinki Finland
2010 : La Bohème de Giacomo Puccini, role Rodolfo, conductor Carlo Rizzi, stage Andreas Homoki, Théâtre royal de la Monnaie
2010 : La Bohème de Giacomo Puccini, role Rodolfo, conductor Paolo Arrivabeni et Andriy Yurkevych, stage Jean-Louis Pichon, Opéra Royal de Wallonie, Liège, Belgium
2010 : Lodoïska de Luigi Cherubini, role Floreski, conductor Jérémie Rhorer, TCE Théâtre des Champs-Élysées Paris, Venise La Fenice, Accademia Nazionale di Santa Cecilia, Roma, Italy
2010 : "Andromaque" by André Ernest Modeste Grétry, role Pyrrhus, conductor Hervé Niquet, stage Georges Lavaudant, Festival de Montpellier, Festival de Schwetzingen, Palais des Beaux-Arts (Bozar) Bruxelles
2010 : Madama Butterfly by Giacomo Puccini, role Pinkerton, conductor Pierre-Michel Durand, stage Jean-François Vinciguerra, Festival de Chartres
2010 : Rigoletto by Giuseppe Verdi, role il Duca, conductor Zubin Mehta, stage Marco Bellocchio, Mantoue
2010 : La Bohème by Giacomo Puccini, role Rodolfo, conductor Laurent Campellone, stage Jean Louis Pichon, Sylvie Auget, Opéra-théâtre de Saint-Étienne, France
2010 : "Andromaque" by André Ernest Modeste Grétry, role Pyrrhus, conductor Hervé Niquet, stage Georges Lavaudant, Festival of Schwetzingen
2010 : La Traviata de Giuseppe Verdi, role Alfredo Germont, conductor Miguel Gomez-Martinez, stage Mariusz Treliński, Wielki Theater, Warsaw, Poland
2010 : La Bohème by Giacomo Puccini, role Rodolfo, conductor Karytinos, stage Graham Vick, Greek National Opera of Athens
2009-2010 : Marius et Fanny de Vladimir Cosma, role Marius, conductor de Dominique Trottein, stage Jean-Louis Grinda, Opéra d'Avignon
2009 : La Bohème by Giacomo Puccini, role Rodolfo, conductor Alexander Joel, Stage Director Willy Decker, Opera Koln, Germany
2009 : La Bohème by Giacomo Puccini, role Rodolfo, conductor Richard Buckley, Stage Director Garnett Bruce, Opera Long Center, Austin, Texas, États-Unis
2009 : "Andromaque" by André Ernest Modeste Grétry, role Pyrrhus, conductor Hervé Niquet, Paris
2009 : Marius et Fanny by Vladimir Cosma, role Marius, conductor Jacques Lacombe, stage Jean-Louis Grinda, Opéra municipal de Marseille
2009 : La Traviata by Giuseppe Verdi, role Alfredo Germont, conductor Kelly Kuo, stage James Marvel, Opera Louisville, Kentucky États-Unis
2009 : "Mireille" by Charles Gounod, role Vincent, conductor Cyril Diedrich, stage Robert Fortune, Opéra municipal de Marseille
2009 : Faust by Charles Gounod, role Faust, conductor Vincent Monteil, stage Opéra de Pampelune, Espagne
2009 : La Périchole by Jacques Offenbach, role Piquillo, conductor Pablo Heras-Casado, stage Omar Porras, Opéra national de Bordeaux, France
2008 : Le Roi d'Ys by Edouard Lalo, role Mylio, conductor Patrick Davin, stage Jean-Louis Pichon, Opéra royal de Wallonie, Liège, Belgium
2008 : Madama Butterfly by Giacomo Puccini, role Pinkerton, stage Ève Ruggiéri, Festival Musiques au Cœur d'Antibes
2008 : Romeo and Juliet by Charles Gounod, role Roméo, conductor Giuliano Carella, Radio Kamer Filharmonie, Concertgebouw Amsterdam
2008 : La Bohème by Giacomo Puccini, role Rodolfo, conductor Karytinos, stage Graham Vick, Opéra d'Athènes, Grèce
2008 : Salammbô by Ernest Reyer, role de Schahabarim, conductor Lawrence Foster, stage Yves Coudray, Opéra municipal de Marseille, France
2007 : Djamileh by Georges Bizet, role Haroun, conductor Miquel Ortega, stage Pierre Jourdan, Théâtre Impérial de Compiègne
2007 : Eugene Oneguin by Piotr Ilitch Tchaïkovski, role Lensky, stage Emmanuelle Cordoliani, Paris Cité de la musique CNSMDP

Discography and video

Discography 
Lodoïska (Opéra: Cherubini), Naïve Ambroisie (2013)
Andromaque (Opéra: Grétry), Glossa (2010)
Songs, Naïve (2011)

Video, DVD 
La Bohème: Live in cinemas CGR from Opera National de Bordeaux 2014, Bordeaux, France
La Traviata: Arte Web Live - Théâtre Royal de La Monnaie De Munt, Dec 2012, Bruxelles, Belgium
La Bohème: Live in cinemas from Teatro La Fenice February 2011, Venezia, Italy
Le Roi d’Ys: Lalo, DVD Dynamic (2009), enregistré à l'Opéra Royal de Wallonie à Lièges, Belgium
La Boite à Musique by Jean-François Zygel, DVD Naïve Records (2007) (vol.1)
Il Trovatore, Live au Théâtre Antique d'Orange with Roberto Alagna, Les Chorégies d'Orange, July 2006

External links 

Sébastien Guèze Operabase
Opera Musica (Sources repertory)
Interview et Photos dans le magazine Tutti Magazine
Interview dans le journal Le Soir
Interview on Romeo (Miami) in "Knight Arts"
English Interview in "Voix des Arts - A Voice for the Arts"

French operatic tenors
1979 births
Living people
Musicians from Lyon
21st-century French male opera singers